Trucco is an Italian surname. Notable people with the surname include:

Alberto Batignani Trucco
Carlos Trucco (born 1957), Bolivian footballer
Manuel Trucco (1875–1954), Chilean politician
Michael Trucco (born 1970), American actor 
Vincenzo Trucco, Italian racing driver 

Italian-language surnames